Binanda Kumar Saikia is a Bharatiya Janata Party politician from Assam. He has been elected in Assam Legislative Assembly election in 2016 from Sipajhar constituency.

Previously, he was member of Indian National Congress from Sipajhar constituency in 2011.

References

External links
 Facebook
 MEMBER OF LEGISLATIVE ASSEMBLY(M.L.A.), ASSAM
 Twitter

Living people
Bharatiya Janata Party politicians from Assam
Assam MLAs 2016–2021
People from Darrang district
1964 births